Upperline may refer to various places in the city of New Orleans, Louisiana, United States:

 17th Street Canal, also known as the Upperline Canal
 Upperline Restaurant
 Upperline Street